Martin Graber is an American politician. A member of the Republican Party, he has served in the Iowa House of Representatives since 2021, for District 83.

Education and early career
Graber was raised in Donnellson, Iowa, and attended Central Lee High School. He earned a degree in business administration at the University of Iowa, and completed a master's degree in business at St. Ambrose University in 1987, followed by a master's degree in strategic studies at the United States Army War College in 2002. Graber served 32 years in the National Guard, retiring with the rank of brigadier general within the Iowa National Guard. During Operation Desert Storm, Graber was deployed to Germany. At other times during his military career, he served with the 224th Engineer Battalion and at Camp Dodge. From 1980 to 1991, Graber was a manager within the human resources department of the Dial Corporation. From 1991, he worked for Ameriprise Financial Service in Fort Madison, Iowa, as a financial adviser.

Political career
At the time of his first state legislative campaign in 2020, Graber was still working for Amerprise, and was serving his second term as chair of the Lee County Republican Party. Graber filed for the Republican nomination for District 83 of the Iowa House of Representatives in March 2020, and defeated incumbent legislator Jeff Kurtz in the November 2020 general elections.

References

Living people
21st-century American politicians
Republican Party members of the Iowa House of Representatives
Iowa National Guard personnel
People from Fort Madison, Iowa
University of Iowa alumni
United States Army War College alumni
St. Ambrose University alumni
Year of birth missing (living people)